The 1939 Macdonald Brier, the Canadian men's national curling championship, was held from March 5 to 9, 1939 at the Granite Club in Toronto, Ontario.

Both Team Manitoba and Team Ontario finished round robin play with 8-1 records, necessitating a tiebreaker playoff for the Brier championship. Ontario, who was skipped by Bert Hall, won the tiebreaker game over Manitoba 12-10 to capture Ontario's second Brier Tankard.

Event Summary
After the sixth draw, there were five teams that had a chance at winning the Brier: British Columbia, Manitoba, Northern Ontario, Ontario, and Saskatchewan. Both British Columbia and Ontario were undefeated at 6-0 while Manitoba and Northern Ontario had one loss each, and Saskatchewan with two losses. 

Both undefeated teams and one loss teams would play each other in the next draw (Draw 7) with Ontario would win the battle of unbeatens over British Columbia 13-8 while Manitoba edged Northern Ontario 11-10. In the next draw, Northern Ontario eliminated Saskatchewan 9-8, but were eliminated themselves when Manitoba beat British Columbia 14-7 while Ontario remained unbeaten with a 13-8 win over Alberta. 

With one draw remaining, Ontario only needed a win or a Manitoba loss to Saskatchewan to clinch the Brier while Manitoba had to win and hope Ontario would lose to Northern Ontario to force a playoff. Manitoba's wishes came true as they held off Saskatchewan 12-10 and Northern Ontario handed Ontario a 13-5 defeat forcing a tiebreaker game between Ontario and Manitoba as they both finished 8-1 in round robin play.

In the playoff, Ontario would jump out to a 7-2 lead after the fourth end. But Manitoba would charge back and after a steal of one in the tenth, Manitoba cut the lead to 10-9 with two ends left. Ontario pulled away and scored two in the eleventh. With Manitoba only scoring one in the last end, Ontario clinched the Brier Tankard for the second time.

Teams
The teams are listed as follows:

Round Robin standings

Round Robin results

Draw 1

Draw 2

Draw 3

Draw 4

Draw 5

Draw 6

Draw 7

Draw 8

Draw 9

Tiebreaker

References 

Macdonald Brier, 1939
Macdonald Brier, 1939
The Brier
Curling in Toronto
Macdonald Brier
Macdonald Brier
1930s in Toronto